Bardhyl Londo (1948 – 18 February 2022) was an Albanian poet and writer.

Life and career
Born in Albania, Bardhyl graduated in Albanian language and Albanian literature at the University of Tirana. After graduation, he taught for several years in schools in the Përmet District, then started working as an editor in the literary magazine Drita (Light).

He made his debut as a poet with a book of poems published in 1975. He was one of the most popular lyrical poets in Albania in the 1980s. He was the author of eight poems and several novels. In 1989, he was awarded the Migjeni writers prize.

In the 1990s, he headed the Albanian Union of Writers and Artists. In 2012, Bardhyl Londo's translation from the English language of Adam Zagajewski's book of poetry, "The City Where I Would Like to Live", was published in Tirana.

In February 2022, Bardhyl was hospitalised in Tirana. He died there on 18 February, at the age of 74.

Works

Poetry 
 Krisma dhe trëndafila, Tirana 1975.
 Hapa në rrugë, Tirana 1981.
 Emrin e ka dashuri, Tirana 1984.
 Si ta qetësoj detin, (How to calm down the ocean), Tirana 1988
 Shën Shiu, Tirana 2010
 Jeta që na dhanë, Tirana 2013

Prose 
 Uhëzime për kapërcimin e detit, Tirana 1984 (novel)

References

1948 births
2022 deaths
20th-century Albanian poets
21st-century Albanian poets
Albanian educators
People from Përmet
Albanian male poets